The 2nd Regiment of Senegalese Tirailleurs was a regiment composed of African infantry formed by the French Army. It was created by decree on 23 April 1892 as the Régiment de Tirailleurs Soudanais. Godefroy Cavaignac, the Minister of Marine and of the Colonies, reported to President Carnot, that the regiment consisted of six companies of Senegalese Tirailleurs  at the time stationed in Sudan with two additional companies of Sudanese auxiliaries. They participated in the capture of Sikasso in 1898.

Creation and various names 
 1892: Creation of the Régiment de Tirailleurs Soudanais
 1900: Renamed 2nd Régiment de Tirailleurs Sénégalais
 2 September 1939: Renamed  2nd  Régiment Mobile de Tirailleurs Sénégalais
 1 April 1940: Went back to 2nd  Régiment de Tirailleurs Sénégalais
 1 October 1940: became Régiment de Tirailleurs Sénégalais du Soudan
 31 December 1946: Dissolved

Banner

References

French expatriate units and formations
Military units and formations established in 1892
Tirailleurs regiments of France
Colonial regiments of France
Military units and formations disestablished in 1946
1892 establishments in French Sudan